A German Salvadoran is a Salvadoran descendant of German citizens who have adopted the two nationalities or Salvadorans who have German ancestry, there is a record of waves of German immigrants since the 19th century, later with the arrival of German refugees during the Second World War. El Salvador has important relations with Germany

History 
Starting in 1871, Salvadoran historiography speaks of a period of "liberal reforms",which brings a significant number of immigrants,In the 19th century, the entry of immigrants was not visible, it was from 1900 when the immigrant population began to grow, mainly from Europe (including Germans) but also from Latin America and  Asia

One of the most famous Germans who immigrated to El Salvador, was Walter Thilo Deininger, in Cuzcatlan to 1885. Whoever soon built his coffee estate and other industries. Besides a confraternity called (La cofradía de Don Balta), the neighbors were saying, the character of Walter was phlegmatic and good-natured. Soon arrived more German families to Cuscatlán Department, El Salvador, as well as important people like Jürgen Hübner-a German historian and author of "Die Deutschen und El Salvador (The Germans and El Salvador). In the early twentieth century between 10 and 15 families immigrated, although the majority later left the country due to political problems.

In 1942, and in the context of the Jewish holocaust by Nazi Germany, several Ashkenazi Jews acquired Salvadoran nationality and moved to live in the country, thanks to the efforts of the diplomat José Arturo Castellanos, who saved 40,000 Jews from Central Europe, including the Germans

Relations between El Salvador and Germany 
Germany is one of the main European trading partners of El Salvador and is the largest importer of Salvadoran coffee. The Chamber of Commerce German-Salvadoran consists of around 85 companies. The Central American integration process was Germany on June 27, 2008 extra-regional observer of the Central American Integration SICA located in San Salvador. In addition to a German school in San Salvador.

References 

Ethnic groups in El Salvador
El Salvador
German diaspora in North America